Dolapo Adeleke  (born 6 September 1990), also known as LowlaDee is a multiple award winning filmmaker from Nigeria.

Early life and education 
Born on September 6, 1990 in Kano State Nigeria, Adeleke began writing at an early age, publishing two literature books before  university. Adeleke had her secondary education in Dansol High School, Lagos State. She graduated with a second class upper in Mass Communication from Covenant University in 2011.

Career 
In an interview with Busayo Adekoya of ThisDay Newspaper, she stated that she began directing films at 21. In 2012, she was included in Vanguard list of young Nigerians making significant impact, and was noted to have won Best teen writer of the year award by Angles Magazine for writing Flesh and Blood and The Little White Hen.

With her break out short film Brave, starring Adesua Etomi and Wole Ojo, She was nominated under the Best Film Director category of the Nigerian Entertainment Awards (NEA 2015). The short film went on to win Best Short film at the Best Of Nollywood Awards and also nominated in two categories at the prestigious African Magic Viewers Choice Awards (AMVCA) for Best Short film and Best Actor in a Drama. In 2015, she went on to produce her first critically acclaimed Television Film A Place Called Happy merging Nigerian and Ghanaian actors.

In 2016, she released her first highly acclaimed Mini SeriesThis Is It on her YouTube Platform merging Nigerian and Kenyan cast. It instantly gained popularity gathering over 8 million views in its entirety. The series successfully launched on various Television Broadcast stations across Africa and went on to win the Best Television Series at the Africa Magic Viewers Choice Awards (AMVCA) 2018. LowlaDee Wrote, Directed and Edited the 20 episodes while working as the Show Runner.

In 2016, LowlaDee was also nominated for the EbonyLifeTV Sisterhood Awards Africa for ‘Film Director Of The Year’ for her achievement with the Mini Series, ‘This Is It’. In 2017, she was nominated for the prestigious ‘Future Awards Africa’ for the prize of New Media and in March 2018 she was listed as Leading Ladies Africa's ‘100 Most Inspiring Women In Nigeria.’

LowlaDee Wrote, Directed and Edited the 60 minutes Valentine's Day Digital film, PLAN B, a Kenyan-Nigerian story which became an instant hit, garnering over one million views in its first two weeks without paid advertising. The movie went on to win the Best East African Film at the Africa Magic Viewers Choice Awards 2019.

She currently runs LowlaDee Productions Co. (formerly Doreen Media) and shuffles between Lagos Nigeria and Nairobi Kenya.

Filmography

Awards

Personal life 
At 16 years old, on 20 August 2007, on her way to get certain documents from school, after gaining admission to Covenant University, Adeleke was involved in a brake failure accident that resulted to multiple surgeries and scars on her forehead. This led to her signature fringe/bangs hairstyle. According to her, it is more than just a hairstyle but empowers her to rise above the trauma and effects of the life changing accident. On an instagram post, LowlaDee revealed she once struggled with depression but watching American-Indian TV show runner and Actress Mindy Kaling's TV show, The Mindy Project,  gave her joy and awakened a fun creative side. This connection gave birth to her highly successful Romcom web series ''This Is It''

See also
 List of Nigerian film producers

References

External links

 Official website

1990 births
Living people
Nigerian film directors
Covenant University alumni
Nigerian women film directors
Nigerian film producers
Nigerian editors
Nigerian screenwriters
Nigerian film award winners
21st-century Nigerian actresses